{{DISPLAYTITLE:C18H21NO2}}
The molecular formulas C18H21NO2 (molar mass: 283.36 g/mol) may refer to :

 N,O-Dimethyl-4-(2-naphthyl)piperidine-3-carboxylate
 HDMP-28
 Methyldesorphine
 6-Methylenedihydrodesoxymorphine
 Naranol
 PRL-8-53